Stanislav Sincovschi (born 16 April 1994) is a Moldovan footballer who plays for Speranța Nisporeni in Moldovan National Division as a midfielder. He has represented his country at under-21 international level

References

External links
Stanislav Sincovschi at Dinamo-Auto

1994 births
Living people
Moldovan footballers
Association football defenders
People from Tiraspol
FC Dinamo-Auto Tiraspol players
Speranța Nisporeni players